The Russian First Division 1998 was the seventh edition of the Russian First Division. The competition was renamed from Russian First League to Russian First Division this year.

Overview

Standings

Top goalscorers 

27 goals

 Andradina  (FC Arsenal Tula)

19 goals

 Igor Gavrilin (FC Saturn Ramenskoye)

18 goals

 Vladyslav Zubkov  (FC Lokomotiv Nizhny Novgorod)

17 goals

 Gurban Gurbanov  (FC Dynamo Stavropol)
 Valeri Shushlyakov (FC Kristall Smolensk)

16 goals

 Aleksei Chernov (FC Lada-Grad Dimitrovgrad)

15 goals

 Oleg Garin (FC Lokomotiv Nizhny Novgorod)
 Ibragim Gasanbekov  (FC Anzhi Makhachkala)
 Aleksandr Kuzmichyov (FC Rubin Kazan)
 Vladimir Lebed (FC Sokol Saratov)

Promotion play-offs 

FC Torpedo-ZIL Moscow promoted to the Russian First Division for 1999 on aggregate, FC Neftekhimik Nizhnekamsk relegated to the Russian Second Division.

See also
Russian Top Division 1998
Russian Second Division 1998

2
Russian First League seasons
Russia
Russia